Cecil Pemberton was a professional footballer who played as a centre forward. He started his career at Horwich RMI before he was signed by Football League Second Division side Burnley in 1930. Pemberton stayed with Burnley for a season but he failed to make a first-team appearance and moved to Yeovil & Petters United in 1932. After a season with Yeovil, he transferred to Millwall, where he played six games and scored one goal in the Football League before retiring in 1933.

References

Year of birth unknown
Association football forwards
Burnley F.C. players
Yeovil Town F.C. players
Millwall F.C. players
English Football League players
English footballers